Rickard Johannes Sandler (29 January 1884 – 12 November 1964) was a Swedish Social Democratic politician. He served as minister without portfolio in the Swedish government from 10 March 1920 to 30 June 1920, minister for finance from 1 July 1920 to 27 October 1920, minister without portfolio from 13 October 1921 to 19 April 1923, minister of commerce and industry from 14 October 1924 to 24 January 1925, Prime Minister from 24 January 1925 to 7 June 1926, and as minister for foreign affairs from 24 September 1932 to 19 June 1936 and again from 28 September 1936 to 13 December 1939. Sandler is the only social democratic prime minister who did not also hold the post of party chairman. He is also the second-youngest prime minister of Sweden, aged 41 when he took office.

Early life and career
Rickard Sandler was born in Torsåker parish (now Kramfors Municipality), Västernorrland County. His father Johan Sandler was a headmaster at a folk high school and later a Member of Parliament. After receiving a Bachelor of Arts degree from Uppsala University, Rickard Sandler became a teacher at a folk high school in Kramfors (where his father was headmaster) and another in Brunnsvik. After joining the Swedish Social Democratic Youth League, Sandler's political career took off. He received a Licentiate of Arts degree in 1911 at the age of 26, after which he became a member of the board of the Social Democratic Party, and would remain a member until 1952. In 1917 he became editor-in-chief for Ny Tid, a social democratic newspaper in Gothenburg.

Rise in politics
In 1918, in the government of Prime Minister Nils Edén, Sandler became secretary of state to the minister for finance, Fredrik Thorsson. He continued in the same capacity when Hjalmar Branting became prime minister in 1920. In 1921 when Thorsson went on to start the new Ministry of Commerce and Industry, Sandler took his place as the minister of finance, a capacity he held until 1923. In Hjalmar Brantings second government (1921 – 1923), Sandler was a minister without portfolio, and in the third the minister of commerce and industry. He took the latter position after some persuasion, as he was intent to take up a job as the headmaster of the folk high school in Brunnsvik.

As Prime Minister
When Hjalmar Branting became ill and left office before his death in February 1925, and Fredrik Thorsson who was a likely candidate to replace Branting as prime minister also fell sick and died, Sandler was appointed to the post at the age of 41.

As Prime Minister, Sandler had to deal with the issue of reducing the Swedish military, as had been promised during the election campaign. He was supported by the Freeminded People's Party in what became the largest disarmament in Sweden. Following disarmament, the issue of unemployment came into focus when the government annulled a decision by the Unemployment Commission (arbetslöshetskommissionen) to deny payment to workers at the Stripa mine who were on strike. The liberal and conservative parties, who held the majority seats in the Riksdag (parliament), disagreed with the government, called for a vote of no confidence, and defeated the government. The 1928 elections saw Arvid Lindman of the conservative General Electoral League becoming the prime minister.

Foreign affairs

Sandler returned to the government in 1932 as minister of foreign affairs, a post he held (except for a brief period in 1936) until 1939. Sandler left the government over a disagreement with the prime minister about the Winter War. Sandler wanted Sweden to actively help Finland after the Soviet Union had attacked it on 30 November 1939, a stance the prime minister did not hold.

Now a deputy, Sandler continued to be influential in Swedish foreign policy. In 1940 he became a member of the Standing Committee on Foreign Affairs (utrikesutskottet), and the chairman from 1946 to 1964. He was also a United Nations Delegate (1947 – 1960).

Other positions
Sandler was governor of Gävleborg County (1941 – 1952). He was chairman of several governmental inquiries, including the Socialization Committee (1920 – 1936), a commission appointed to audit the Swedish refugee policy during World War II, known as the Sandler Commission (1945 – 1947), and the Commission on the Constitution (1954 – 1963).

Sandler was one of the founders of The Workers' Enlightenment League (Arbetarnas Bildningsförbund ABF) in 1912. He was the main writer of the Marxist-oriented party program of the Social Democratic Party in 1920. He published the widely circulated statistical outline of social classes "The society as it is" (1911). Between 1926 and 1932 he was director of Statistics Sweden (Statistiska centralbyrån). Sandler translated Das Kapital by Karl Marx into Swedish, and in 1943 he authored a book on literary and historic secret writings called Cipher.

References

A major expansion of this article on 23 June 2006 was translated from the Swedish Wikipedia article, :sv:Rickard Sandler.

External links

Government Offices of Sweden
 

1884 births
1964 deaths
People from Kramfors Municipality
Members of the Riksdag from the Social Democrats
Prime Ministers of Sweden
County governors of Sweden
Swedish Ministers for Finance
Swedish Ministers for Foreign Affairs
Uppsala University alumni
Permanent Representatives of Sweden to the United Nations
Members of the Royal Swedish Academy of Sciences